Qelij (also Romanized as Qelīj; also known as Qelīch) is a village in Behi-e Feyzolah Beygi Rural District, in the Central District of Bukan County, West Azerbaijan Province, Iran. At the 2006 census, its population was 57, in 9 families.

References 

Populated places in Bukan County